Loop 368 is a state highway loop in the U.S. state of Texas that follows a former route of US 81 in San Antonio.  in length, the route is a major arterial in the city, providing access to Brackenridge Park, the San Antonio Zoo, and the University of the Incarnate Word.

Route description
Loop 368 begins northeast of Downtown San Antonio at I-35 near that route's interchange with I-37 and US 281. It heads northeast along Broadway through Midtown San Antonio, and through the cities of Alamo Heights and Terrell Hills. At an intersection with Austin Highway, Loop 368 turns onto that roadway. The highway continues to the northeast to its northern terminus at the interchange of I-35 and I-410.

History
Loop 368 follows the original routing of US 81 on the northeast side of San Antonio.  US 81 was first designated along this stretch in 1927 and is the basis of the name Austin Highway, as US 81 was the primary route from San Antonio to Austin at the time. On August 1, 1962, when US 81 was rerouted onto the freeway to the east, the old segment was designated as Loop 368, but signed as Business U.S. 81. The route was signed as Loop 368 after US 81 was decommissioned south of Fort Worth in 1991.

On December 18, 2014, the section from Burr Road in Alamo Heights to I-35 was planned to be removed from the state highway system as part of TxDOT's San Antonio turnback program, which gave  of roads to the city. The turnback of the Burr Road to I-35 section was to have occurred upon the issuance of the project acceptance letter for the improvements along that section. However, on January 27, 2022, TxDOT announced that it would retain jurisdiction over that portion of Loop 368, noting that the city did not provide the required acceptance letter for the project.

Under the leadership of mayor Ron Nirenberg, the city of San Antonio tried to add Protected bike lanes and narrowing the existing lanes on Broadway along with lowering the speed limits, but the Texas Department of Transportation did not allow that. Nirenberg accused the state DoT of "1950s thinking" and having a "religious fascination" with highway expansion.

Junction list

References

368
Transportation in San Antonio
Transportation in Bexar County, Texas
U.S. Route 81